Payena grandistipula is a tree in the family Sapotaceae. The specific epithet  is from the Latin meaning "large stipules". Its habitat is riparian forests. P. grandistipula is endemic to Borneo and known only from Sarawak.

References

grandistipula
Endemic flora of Borneo
Trees of Borneo
Flora of Sarawak
Plants described in 1997